Ray Bull is a British psychologist and emeritus professor of forensic psychology at the University of Leicester. He is also a visiting professor at the University of Portsmouth and a part-time professor of criminal investigation at the University of Derby. Since 2014, he has been the president of the European Association of Psychology and Law.

Work
Bull is known for his work on investigative interviewing of criminal suspects, witnesses, and victims.

Honors and awards
Bull was elected as an Honorary Fellow of the British Psychological Society in 2010, a fellow of the Association of Psychological Sciences in 2009, and received the International Investigative Interviewing Research Group's Senior Academic Award in 2009. In 2012, he became the first honorary lifetime member of the International Investigative Interviewing Research Group. In 2008, he received the European Association of Psychology and Law's Award for Life-time Contribution to Psychology and Law.

References

British psychologists
Forensic psychologists
Fellows of the British Psychological Society
Living people
Academics of the University of Leicester
Academics of the University of Portsmouth
Academics of the University of Derby
Year of birth missing (living people)